Lewsey Farm is a suburb of Luton, in the Luton district, in the ceremonial county of Bedfordshire, England. Situated in the north-west of the town, the area is roughly bounded by the Woodside Link to the north, Leagrave High Street to the south, Poynters Road to the west, and Pastures Way to the east. The wider area including nearby districts Lewsey Park and Lewsey are sometimes referred to as Lewsey Farm.

History
Lewsey Farm takes its name from the former farm on the site of the modern suburb, 'Lewsey Farm'. Poynters Road, which passes by Lewsey Farm and forms the border between Luton and Dunstable, was named after Poynters Farm which was slightly to the north of Lewsey Farm. Lewsey Farm was situated on land belonging to the Lucy (Lewsey) family (who owned the manor from 1305 to 1455).

Lewsey Farm was built on land north of Lewsey in the 1960s and 1970s. When it was built there was still open land to the east and north of the suburb, until the suburb of Lewsey Park was built to the east a few decades later. A large amount of the houses were social housing, built in the typical style of the time, straight roads of square yellow or grey brick built terraced houses.

Local area
At the centre of Lewsey Farm is St. Dominic’s Square, the local shopping area. This includes a greengrocer, post office, newsagent, supermarket, chemist, a co-op, and a general store selling halal meat.

The area is served by St. Martin de Porres Roman Catholic Church, at the corner of Leagrave High Street and Pastures Way. Lewsey Farm also has a doctors surgery and pharmacy in the north of the area, Wheatfields Surgery. Regis Road recreation ground is in the area, which includes a park and play facilities.

Schools

Primary schools 

Chantry Primary Academy
Ferrars Junior School
St Martin de Porres Primary School
Southfield Primary School

Secondary schools 
 Chalk Hills Academy

Politics
Lewsey Farm is part of the larger Lewsey ward, which also includes Lewsey and Lewsey Park. The ward is represented by Cllr Jacqui Burnett (Labour), Cllr Aslam Khan (Labour) and Council leader Cllr Hazel Simmons (Labour).

The ward forms part of the parliamentary constituency of Luton North and the MP is Sarah Owen (Labour).

Local attractions

References

Areas of Luton